KSKJ-CD, virtual channel 45 (UHF digital channel 26), is a low-powered, Class A Daystar Español-affiliated television station licensed to Van Nuys, California, United States. The station is owned by Innovate Corp. Innovate had elected to take the station dark while it builds a new transmission facility on Mt Wilson or Mt Harvard which will dramatically improve the station's coverage area. As part of the FCC's repack, KSKJ-CD moved from digital channel 45 to digital channel 26. The new transmission facility was expected to be completed during the December 1, 2018-April 12, 2019 time period which is Phase 2 of the FCC's planned repack.

History
Founded on August 23, 1989, KSKP-CA was a co-owned class A television station in Oxnard, California broadcasting in analog on UHF channel 25. The station's license was cancelled by the Federal Communications Commission and the KSKP-CA call sign deleted from its database on November 16, 2012.

On January 30, 2013, Capital Broadcasting Corporation filed to sell KSKJ-CD to NRJ TV (a company unrelated to European broadcaster NRJ Radio). During NRJ TV's ownership, KSKJ was a sister station to NRJ TV's KSCI.

Digital television

Digital channels
The station’s signal is multiplexed:

References

External links

Television channels and stations established in 1989
Low-power television stations in the United States
SKJ-CD
Innovate Corp.
1989 establishments in California
Classic Reruns TV affiliates